Alexander Echenique (born 11 November 1971) is a Venezuelan former footballer. He played in 17 matches for the Venezuela national football team from 1993 to 1997. He was also part of Venezuela's squad for the 1993 Copa América tournament.

References

External links
 

1971 births
Living people
Venezuelan footballers
Venezuela international footballers
Place of birth missing (living people)
Association football defenders
Deportivo Táchira F.C. players
20th-century Venezuelan people
21st-century Venezuelan people